Battista Ghiano (born 27 September 1899, date of death unknown) was an Italian racing cyclist. He rode in the 1926 Tour de France.

References

1899 births
Year of death missing
Italian male cyclists
Place of birth missing